Argia is a two-masted, gaff topsail schooner. Argia's home port is Mystic, Connecticut, United States. The Argia was built in 1986 to be used as a tourism and charter vessel.

Argia operates during the months of May through October. She is a replica of a 19th-century schooner, designed and built by Captain Frank Fulchiero. Fulchiero named the boat after Argia the water nymph of the Tiber River in Rome. She carries up to 49 passengers on the waters of Fishers Island Sound for two to three hour day sails, charters, and marine science/ coastal ecology programs. The Coastal Ecology Program utilizes various sampling and testing techniques to provide students with a better understanding of marine and coastal ecosystems.

See also
 List of schooners

References

Museum ships in Mystic, Connecticut
Schooners of the United States
1986 ships
Individual sailing vessels
Replica ships
Ships built in Louisiana